The 2019 Roorkee Municipal Corporation election was a municipal election to the Roorkee Municipal Corporation, which governs Roorkee in Uttarakhand. It took place on 22 November 2019.

Election schedule 
The Uttarakhand State Election Commission announced the poll dates on 22 October 2019, that the election will be held on 22 November and that the result will be declared on 24 November.

Mayoral election

Position of the house

See also
2019 Uttarakhand local elections
2018 Uttarakhand local elections
2018 Dehradun Municipal Corporation election

References

Roorkee
Local elections in Uttarakhand
2019 elections in India
Roorkee